The 1986 Overseas Final was the sixth running of the Overseas Final as part of the qualification for the 1986 Speedway World Championship Final to be held in Chorzów, Poland. The 1986 Final was held at the Brandon Stadium in Coventry, England on 19 June and was the second last qualifying round for Commonwealth and American riders.

The Top 9 riders qualified for the Intercontinental Final to be held in Bradford, England.

1986 Overseas Final
19 June
 Coventry, Brandon Stadium
Qualification: Top 9 plus 1 reserve to the Intercontinental Final in Bradford

Classification

References

See also
 Motorcycle Speedway

1986
World Individual